Lieutenant General Ivan Lemmer  (born 1931) 
was a former South African Army officer, who served as Chief of Staff Logistics.

Army career 
He served as Acting Chief of Staff Intelligence from 1977 and in 1978, he was promoted to the rank of lieutenant general and appointed as Chief of Staff Logistics. He retired from the SADF with pension in 1989.

Awards and decorations

References

South African generals
1931 births
Possibly living people
Date of birth missing (living people)
Place of birth missing (living people)